M. A. Kasem is a Awami League politician and the former member of parliament for Faridpur-17.

Career
Kasem was elected to parliament from Faridpur-17 as an Awami League candidate in 1973. He was elected in a by-election after the incumbent member of parliament, AFM Nurul Haque Hawladar, was assassinated.

References

Awami League politicians
Living people
1st Jatiya Sangsad members
Year of birth missing (living people)